Apteryx littoralis (meaning "kiwi of the shore") is an extinct species of kiwi from New Zealand's North Island. The species was first described in 2021 based on the holotype (NMNZ S.36731), a complete left tarsometatarsus that was found in the Pleistocene (Calabrian)-aged Rangitikei Formation (Kaimatira Pumice Sand).

Discovery and naming
The holotype, NMNZ S.36731, was discovered in 1998 in a strata of the Rangitikei Formation known as the Kaimatira Pumice Sand, near Marton, North Island. NMNZ S.36731 was compared to 161 other tarsometatarsi from other extant kiwi species and the species Apteryx littoralis was named and described by Tennyson & Tomotani in 2021.

Description
A. littoralis is the second oldest record of kiwis known to date and is also the only known extinct species belonging to the Apteryx genus and is one of two known extinct kiwi species - the other is Proapteryx micromeros. A. littoralis most closely resembles A. rowi and A. mantelli in size and shape, but differs in being stouter, with proportionally narrower proximal and distal ends. Based on this, A. littoralis demonstrates a relatively conservative kiwi morphology since the mid-Pleistocene.

Paleobiology
Based on where the holotype was discovered, Apteryx littoralis was probably restricted to a coastal region due to volcanic activity in the central North Island, restricting its range and habitat to a small region of the island.

Extinction
It is unknown when A. littoralis went extinct, although it disappears from the fossil record around 771,000 years ago, at the end of the Calabrian stage of the Pleistocene. This is likely because rocks from the Rangitikei Formation, where A. littorallis was discovered, stopped being deposited after the Calabrian.

References 

Pleistocene extinctions
Apteryx
Extinct birds of New Zealand
Birds of the North Island
Fossil taxa described in 2021
Ratites
Flightless birds
Birds described in 2021
Endemic birds of New Zealand